Augusta is a city in Woodruff County, Arkansas, United States, located on the east bank of the White River.  The population was 2,199 at the 2010 census.  The city is the county seat of Woodruff County.

Geography
Augusta is located at  (35.286501, -91.360935).

Region

Augusta is located in the Arkansas Delta, one of the six primary geographic regions of Arkansas. The Arkansas Delta is a subregion of the Mississippi Alluvial Plain, which is a flat area consisting of rich, fertile sediment deposits from the Mississippi River between Louisiana and Illinois. Prior to settlement, Woodruff County was densely forested, with bayous, sloughs, and swamps crossing the land. Seeking to take advantage of the area's fertile soils, settlers cleared the land to better suit row crops.

County
Although some swampland has been preserved in the Cache River NWR and some former farmland has undergone reforestation, the majority (56 percent) of the county remains in cultivation.

The nearby Cache River NWR, owned by the United States Fish and Wildlife Service, is a preservation area maintaining the original features of the area.

Climate
Woodruff County has a humid subtropical climate (Köppen Cfa). Woodruff County experiences all four seasons, although summers can be extremely hot and humid and winters are mild with little snow. Temperatures above  are not uncommon.

Demographics

2020 census

As of the 2020 United States Census, there were 1,998 people, 966 households, and 597 families residing in the city.

2000 census
As of the census of 2000, there were 2,665 people, 1,070 households, and 741 families residing in the city. The racial makeup of the city was 55% White, 42.99% Black or African American, 2% Native American, 0.08% from other races, and 0.64% from two or more races.  0.38% of the population were Hispanic or Latino of any race.

There were 1,070 households, out of which 32.3% had children under the age of 18 living with them, 42.2% were married couples living together, 22.8% had a female householder with no husband present, and 30.7% were non-families. 28.1% of all households were made up of individuals, and 13.3% had someone living alone who was 65 years of age or older.  The average household size was 2.46 and the average family size was 3.00.

In the city, the population was spread out, with 28.3% under the age of 18, 9.2% from 18 to 24, 24.8% from 25 to 44, 23.2% from 45 to 64, and 14.5% who were 65 years of age or older.  The median age was 36 years. For every 100 females, there were 90.8 males.  For every 100 females age 18 and over, there were 81.5 males.

The median income for a household in the city was $21,500, and the median income for a family was $24,506. Males had a median income of $24,781 versus $18,176 for females. The per capita income for the city was $12,865.  About 23.6% of families and 28.9% of the population were below the poverty line, including 41.9% of those under age 18 and 24.9% of those age 65 or over.

Education

Public education for early childhood, elementary and secondary school students is provided by the Augusta School District, which leads to graduation from Augusta High School.

Local attractions
The 64 Speedway was a popular short track motor racing location which closed in 2007.

The Jess Norman Post 166 American Legion Hut on 1st Street was listed on the National Register of Historic Places in 2001.

Notable people
 Michael John Gray, farmer with a law degree in his native Augusta; Democratic former member of the Arkansas House of Representatives (2015-2019) and state Democratic Party chairman
 Jimmy Gunn, professional football player.
 John D. Price, U.S. Navy admiral who held five aviation world records.
 Victor Rodman, actor.
 Billy Ray Smith, Sr., professional football player; father of Billy Ray Smith, Jr.

See also

Notes

References

External links
 city history

Cities in Arkansas
Cities in Woodruff County, Arkansas
County seats in Arkansas
Populated places established in 1848